Stanford is a village and civil parish in Kent, England. It is part of the Folkestone and Hythe district.

The village developed along the ancient Roman Stone Street and was divided by the construction of the M20 motorway into Stanford North and Stanford South. Stanford Windmill and parish church of All Saints are in the village. 

The parish includes the hamlet of Westenhanger. Folkestone Racecourse was located here; during World War II it served as the RAF Westenhanger airfield, and eventually closed for redevelopment in December 2012.  Westenhanger Castle is adjacent to the racecourse. There is a proposed large-scale development named Otterpool Park for this area.

Transport
Westenhanger railway station serves the parish on the Ashford to Dover line, as well as local buses to Hythe.

References

External links

 Stanford Parish Council

Villages in Kent